Roupala brasiliensis is a species of plant in the family Proteaceae native to Brazil and Argentina.

References

brasiliensis
Flora of Brazil
Flora of Argentina
Flora of the Cerrado
Plants described in 1841